The 24th Air Flotilla (第二十四航空戦隊, Dai-Nijūyon Kōkū-Sentai) was a combat aviation unit of the Imperial Japanese Navy (IJN) during the Pacific Campaign of World War II. The flotilla, mainly consisting of land-based bombers, fighters, and flying boats, reported to the IJN's 4th Fleet. As originally organized, the flotilla's core units were the 4th Air Corps, Yokohama Air Corps, and 1st Air Corps.

Organization
The 4th Combined Air Group (第4連合航空隊, Dai-yon Rengō Kōkutai) was original unit of the 24th Air Flotilla, therefore, describe this section from the 4th Combined Air Group.

Commanding officers

Footnotes

References

Notes

Bibliography

Units of the Imperial Japanese Navy Air Service
Military units and formations established in 1940
Military units and formations disestablished in 1944